Charles Naylor (October 6, 1806 – December 24, 1872) was an American lawyer and politician from Pennsylvania who served as a Whig party member of the United States House of Representatives for Pennsylvania's 3rd congressional district from 1837 to 1841.

Early life and education
Naylor was born in Philadelphia, Pennsylvania. At a young age he read John Neal's poem Battle of Niagara and became inspired by Neal's life. Years later as a member of Congress he met Neal and told him, "If the author of that poem...could do what he has done here, under so many disadvantages, why cannot I? I will!...you were my inspiration, and for all that I now am, and all I hope to be hereafter, I am indebted to you." He studied law, was admitted to the bar in 1828 and commenced practice in Philadelphia.

Career
He held several local offices, and was an unsuccessful candidate for election in 1836 to the Twenty-fifth Congress.

He was elected as a Whig to the Twenty-fifth Congress to fill the vacancy caused by the death of Francis Jacob Harper.  There were allegations of fraud during the election against Charles J. Ingersoll.  Local election officials certified Ingersoll as the winner while state officials declared Naylor the winner.  Both candidates claimed victory and appeared in Washington D.C. to claim the seat.  Congress declared Naylor the winner by 775 votes and he was sworn into office.  He was reelected to the Twenty-sixth Congress.  He declined to be a candidate for renomination in 1840.  He resumed the practice of law.

In 1844 Naylor was present at the Philadelphia Bible Riots of 1844.  During the rioting in Southwark he prevented militia under the command of Gen. George Cadwalader from firing on a group of nativist protesters.  He was arrested for his actions, but later released without trial.

During the Mexican–American War, Naylor raised a company of volunteers known as the Philadelphia Rangers and served as captain.  After the war he settled in Pittsburgh, Pennsylvania, and continued the practice of law.  He returned to Philadelphia and practiced law until his death there in 1872.  He is interred in Laurel Hill Cemetery in Philadelphia.

References

External links
 
 The Political Graveyard
 Speech of Charles Naylor, of Pennsylvania, on the Bill Imposing Additional Duties, as Depositaries, in Certain Cases, on Public Officers. Delivered in the House of Representatives, U.S., October 13, 1837

1806 births
1872 deaths
American military personnel of the Mexican–American War
Politicians from Philadelphia
Pennsylvania lawyers
Whig Party members of the United States House of Representatives from Pennsylvania
Burials at Laurel Hill Cemetery (Philadelphia)
19th-century American politicians
19th-century American lawyers